Høyjord Stave Church is a stave church in the village of Høyjord in Andebu in the municipality of Sandefjord in Vestfold og Telemark county, Norway. It is the only stave church left in Vestfold County. It is also Norway's southernmost stave church. It is one of three remaining center post churches (midtmastkirke) in Norway. The stave church is commonly dated to around the year 1300, however, parts of the church were constructed in the 1100s and in 1275.

It is single-naved with a square chancel. It is a Numedal type church constructed in 1200–1300. Restorations were initiated in the 1600s. After World War II it also underwent restoration. The Medieval nave and the chancel's main structural components are preserved. Its wooden vault over the chancel has been reconstructed.

Description
The church was constructed in two different centuries. It has a 12th-century Romanesque chancel and a Gothic nave that was added roughly a hundred years later. It is a single-nave church with twelve posts or staves, all of which are different. It likely had a central mast at one time, which may date to 1690. In 1689, the church was modified and a new ceiling was installed. A central mast of this type was built to symbolize Jesus, while the twelve posts symbolized the twelve apostles. A foundation stone for a central mast was discovered during the 1948-53 restorations. The restoration was led by architect Otto L. Scheen. Medieval discoveries were also retrieved, including a consecration cross, proving the church had been consecrated by the bishop. Traces of decorations in the chancel were also uncovered along with 8-10 consecration wall crosses. In 1960, the church's altarpiece was restored by Finn Kraft.

During the 1948-53 restorations, five preserved skeletons of a man, two children, and two women were retrieved from under a thin layer of soil beneath the chancel floor. The bodies were dated to the time of the Black Death in the mid-1300s.

History 
The church was built at the end of the 11th century. The church was later removed once and rebuilt. The last reconstruction was completed between 1948 and 1953, at which time major changes were made and the church received the design it has today.  The church is also the only remaining stave church in Vestfold county. The church is one of two preserved churches with a pillar or post in the middle. In addition to this central post there are 12 staves, all of which support the building. Each stave has a unique design.

Gallery

References

Related reading 
 Leif Anker (2005) The Norwegian Stave Churches (Oslo: Arfo Forlag)

External links 

 Høyjord Stave Church in Stavkirke.org  – in Norwegian

Stave churches in Norway
Churches in Vestfold og Telemark
Culture in Vestfold og Telemark
Churches completed in 1950
20th-century churches
Tourist attractions in Vestfold og Telemark